Milošev Do (Serbian Cyrillic: Милошев До) is a village in the municipality of the Prijepolje in the Zlatibor District of Serbia. According to the 2002 census, Milošev Do had a population of 126 people. Milošev Do lies between Jadovnik and Zlatar mountains, on the Mileševka river. It consists of the hamlets of Prisoje, Gvozd and Svičevići.

See also 
Zlatibor District
List of places in Serbia

External links 
 Municipality of Prijepolje
 Milošev Do and surrounding villages
 Satellite Maps (-{Wikimapia}-)

Populated places in Zlatibor District